DZVC (1224 AM & 94.3 FM) Radyo Pilipinas is a radio station owned and operated by the Philippine Broadcasting Service. Its studios & transmitter are located inside the Catanduanes State University campus, Brgy. Calatagan, Virac, Catanduanes.

References

Radio stations in Catanduanes
Radio stations established in 1991